Jaroslav Mysliveček (born 1908, date of death unknown) was a Czech rower. He competed in the men's coxed four at the 1936 Summer Olympics.

References

1908 births
Year of death missing
Czech male rowers
Olympic rowers of Czechoslovakia
Rowers at the 1936 Summer Olympics
Place of birth missing